Killer Tongue (La lengua asesina) is a 1996 British/Spanish comedy sci-fi/horror film directed by Alberto Sciamma and starring Melinda Clarke, Jason Durr, and Robert Englund.

Plot
After a successful bank heist Candy and Johnny go on the run, abandoning the rest of their crew. Johnny is soon arrested and Candy is forced to hide out in a convent. An alien infested meteor lands in Candy's soup which infects her and her pet poodles. The infection causes dramatic changes in everyone who has consumed it, causing her poodles to transform into drag queens. Soon Candy also starts changing, her hair and skin change colour, spikes protrude from her spine, and her tongue extends and soon becomes murderous. This causes Candy to kill multiple people in various ways using her now bloodthirsty tongue.

Cast
Melinda Clarke as Candy
Jason Durr as Johnny
Mapi Galán as Rita
Robert Englund as Prison Director
Alicia Borrachero as Reporter
Doug Bradley as Wig
Terry Forrestal as Postman
Jonathan Rhys Meyers as Rudolph
Stephen Marcus as Ralph
Edward Tudor-Pole as Flash
Nigel Whitmey as Chip

Reception
Reviews for the film where overwhelmingly negative, criticizing the script, acting and comedy.

Awards
Melinda Clarke won the 1996 Sitges Film Festival Best Actress Award for her role in Killer Tongue.

References

External links

1990s comedy horror films
Spanish multilingual films
British multilingual films
Spanish comedy horror films
British comedy horror films
English-language Spanish films
1990s Spanish-language films
Films directed by Alberto Sciamma
1990s British films